Danala is a genus of moths in the family Geometridae.

Species
 Danala laxtaria Walker, 1860
 Danala lilacina (Wileman, 1915)

References
 Danala at Markku Savela's Lepidoptera and Some Other Life Forms
 Natural History Museum Lepidoptera genus database

Abraxini